Frederick Daniel Tyler (born March 15, 1954) is an American competitive swimmer and aquatics coach, winner of several high school and college championships and a gold medal in the 4×200-meter freestyle relay at the 1972 Summer Olympics and author.

High school and Indiana University
Tyler began his high school swimming at St. Andrews School, in Boca Raton, Florida, where in 1969 and 1970 he won the 400-yard freestyle and 200-yard individual medley (IM) at the state high school championships.  He then attended The Bolles School, a prep school in Jacksonville, Florida, where he swam for the Bolles high school swim team.  At the 1971 state championship meet, he was first in the 200- and 400-yard freestyle, and in 1972 won the 100-yard freestyle and 200-yard individual medley.  Tyler remains one of only seven swimmers to win the Florida state swim championship in two different events for three separate years.  He graduated from The Bolles School in 1972. Tyler was the first swimmer to earn All American honors in every individual event. He achieves this feat 3 straight years.

Tyler, along with John Kinsella, Mark Spitz and Gary Hall, Sr., was a member of coach James Counsilman's standout Indiana Hoosiers swim team at Indiana University, which dominated men's college swimming in the early 1970s. During his college career, Tyler's Indiana teams were Big Ten Conference champions for four consecutive years and NCAA national champions in 1972 and 1973.  In 1975, Tyler was the NCAA individual national champion in the 200-yard individual medley (time of 1:50:658), and his 800-yard freestyle relay finished first in the NCAA finals in 1973, 1974 and 1975. He closed out his time as a Hoosier swimmer as one of the best swimmers in the history of the program, receiving 14 career All-America honors. Freddie was inducted into the Indiana University Athletic Hall of Fame on October 28, 2016.

Munich Olympics

In spite of the terrorist attacks against the Israeli athletes, some of the most spectacular events at the 1972 Summer Olympics in Munich were in swimming, where Mark Spitz won seven Olympic titles with seven world records.  On August 29, 1972, Tyler finished 5th in finals of 200 meter freestyle, missing Indiana teammate Mark Spitz' world record time by 2.18 seconds. On August 31, 1972, the American 4 × 200 meter freestyle relay of John Kinsella, Fred Tyler, Steve Genter and Mark Spitz set a World & Olympic record at 7:35:78, eclipsing the record set earlier that day by the USA team in the semifinal heat, and winning the Olympic gold medal. The victory was all the more remarkable in that Spitz swam in the 4x200 relay only one hour after his world record victory in the 100 meter butterfly, and Genter had been released from the hospital only a few days before, following surgery for a collapsed lung.

Coaching

Tyler began coaching swimming and water polo at West Orange High School in Winter Garden, Florida from 1980 to 1985. He coached at Mount Dora High School from 1986 through 1989.  He has been head aquatics coach at Lake Mary High School in Lake Mary, Florida since 1990.  He coached the Lake Mary Rams to a second-place finish in 2004 and fourth place in 2005 at Florida state swimming championships.  Tyler's boys' water polo team reached the 2005 state quarter finals, and the girls' the state 2005 semis and the 2007 quarter finals.  In 2004-05, Fred Tyler was recognized as both the Seminole Athletic Conference and Florida State 3A Coach of Year.  Tyler coached gold medal winner Brad Bridgewater (200-meter backstroke at 1996 Summer Games), who attended Lake Mary High School from 1987 to 1990.  Tyler teaches social studies and mathematics to exceptional education students and Algebra and Geometry to Regular education students.

Author
Published Homesick - The Novel in March 2018

See also
 List of Indiana University (Bloomington) people
 List of Olympic medalists in swimming (men)
 World record progression 4 × 200 metres freestyle relay

References

External links
1972 Olympics Official Site
Olympic winners, Men's 4x200 freestyle relay
Central Florida Olympians

1954 births
Living people
American male freestyle swimmers
American swimming coaches
World record setters in swimming
Indiana Hoosiers men's swimmers
Olympic gold medalists for the United States in swimming
Sportspeople from Winter Park, Florida
Swimmers at the 1972 Summer Olympics
Medalists at the 1972 Summer Olympics
People from Lake Mary, Florida
Bolles School alumni